Adroit may refer to:

 Adroit class minesweeper, a U.S. Navy minesweeper class
 Adroitness, a personality trait related to agreeableness
 HMAS Adroit (P 82), an Attack-class patrol boat
 L'Adroit class destroyer, a group of fourteen French navy destroyers
 USS Adroit (AM-82), an Adroit-class minesweeper
 USS Adroit (MSO-509), an Acme-class minesweeper
 USS Adroit (SP-248), a steam yacht